Johan Axelsson Oxenstierna af Södermöre (24 June 1611 – 5 December 1657) was a Count and a Swedish statesman.

Biography
The son of Lord High Chancellor Axel Oxenstierna, he was born in Stockholm. He completed his studies at Uppsala in 1633, and was sent by his father on a grand tour through France, the Netherlands and Great Britain. He served under his brother-in-law Count Gustav Horn af Björneborg in the Thirty Years' War from 1632, and was subsequently employed by his father in various diplomatic missions, though his instructions were always so precise and minute that he was little more than the executor of the Chancellor's wishes. He was one of the commissioners who signed the truce of 1635 with Poland (Armistice of Stuhmsdorf or Treaty of Sztumska Wieś), and in 1639, much against his father's will, was made a Privy Councillor.

Along with Salvius he represented Sweden at the great peace congress of Osnabrück, but as he received his instructions direct from his father, whereas Salvius was in the confidence of Queen Christina, the two "legates" were constantly at variance. From 1650 to 1652 he was Governor General of Swedish Pomerania. King Charles X Gustav made him Marshal of the Realm.

See also
Polish-Swedish War

Notes

External links

1611 births
1657 deaths
Politicians from Stockholm
Johan
Marshals of the Realm
Swedish diplomats
Uppsala University alumni
17th-century Swedish politicians